The Krupp night decoy site  was a German decoy-site of the Krupp steelworks in Essen. It was designed to divert Allied night airstrikes in the bombing of Essen in World War II from the actual production site of the arms factory.

Description 
It occupied an area of 1.5 km × 2.5 km.

The dummy factory was supposed to mimic a poorly darkened and operating Krupp steel works as the Royal Air Force only flew at night. The decoy system consisted of a large number of very rudimentary dummy installations of industrial building and structures. shed roofs, a gasometer, chimneys, a railroad and elaborate light arrays and fires were among them, controlled from a nearby bunker.

Efficiency 
RAF Bomber Command did not correctly identify the installation until 1943, by which time its bombers had dropped 64 percent of all high-explosive bombs and 75 percent of all incendiaries on it rather than the real site.

Today's condition 
Today, only the control-bunker of the decoy-site is preserved. After systematic research and documentation by volunteers of the Landschaftsverband Rheinland (LVR) – Office for Archeologist Monument Protection, it was listed as a historical monument in 2013.

Museum development 
The bunker is located on private property. Visits are offered on the European Heritage Days, historical walks or the Long Night of Museums.

References 

Sources

Further reading

 
 
 Helmut Grau, Jürgen Lohbeck, Josef Johannes Niedworok, Sven Polkläser: Vergessene Täuschungsbauwerke des Zweiten Weltkrieges. Die Krupp'sche Nachtscheinanlage in Velbert. In: Archäologie im Rheinland 2013. Theiss Verlag, Darmstadt 2014, .
 Wiebke Hoppe: Kruppsche Nachtscheinanlage, Kreis Mettmann. In: LVR-Amt für Bodendenkmalpflege im Rheinland, Rheinischer Verein für Denkmalpflege und Landschaftsschutz (ed.): Archäologische Kriegsrelikte im Rheinland. Klartext Verlag, Essen 2014, .
 Elke Janßen-Schnabel: Das Scheindorf der Kruppwerke. In: Denkmalpflege im Rheinland, vol. 30 (2013), no. 4.
 Jürgen Lohbeck: Das vergessene Scheindorf in Velbert. Die Kruppsche Nachtscheinanlage auf dem Rottberg im Zweiten Weltkrieg 1941–1945. Scala Verlag, Velbert 2012, . (Summary in German)
 Jürgen Lohbeck: Der Krieg vor unserer Haustür. Ereignisse, Erlebnisse, Schicksale im Zweiten Weltkrieg in Velbert, Langenberg und Umgebung. Scala Verlag, Velbert 2013, . (Summary in German)
 Bau- und Betriebsgrundsätze für Scheinanlagen, published by Reichsminister der Luftfahrt und Oberbefehlshaber der Luftwaffe (Az. 41 L 46 10 Nr. 9659/42 (L. In. 13/3 III C/a), November 1942
 Luftwaffen-Dienstvorschrift 2400 Betrieb von Scheinanlagen, L.Dv.g. 2400, published by Reichsminister der Luftfahrt und Oberbefehlshaber der Luftwaffe, May 1941

External links 
 Community of interest for the museum development of the monument control bunker Kruppsche Nachtscheinanlage (in German)
 Audio post on Deutschlandfunk Kultur on Dec.4-th 2018: Forgotten History of decoy sites – fake steel works an railwaystations (in German)

World War II sites in Germany
Military deception during World War II
Krupp